Kephalaia (Greek for "chapters" or "headings") are a genre of Manichaean literature represented mainly by two large papyrus codices containing Coptic translations from 5th-century Roman Egypt. The kephalaia are sometimes seen as the actual words or teachings of the prophet Mani, but are probably better viewed as later discourses and interpretations laid upon "an authoritative oral tradition" ostensibly going back to Mani and thus analogous to the Talmud in Judaism and the ḥadīth in Islam.

Although the Kephalaia likely originated, like hadiths as accounts of the life and actions of Mani, the utility of the genre was such that it came to incorporate a wide variety of literary styles subjected artificially to the constraints of the format: instruction, exegesis, narrative, dialogue, parable, miracle-story, and even epic traditions.

The discovery of the Kephalaia has been revolutionary in transforming scholarship on early Manichaean traditions, and even the secular history of the Sassanid Empire.

Despite the apocryphal and heavily reworked nature of the available text, most prominently from Coptic translation, it is an authentic representation of traditions first held and developed by the Manichean communities in the early Sasanian period and within the Iranian empire. As such, this is a unique source for literature, religion and society from a known context that substantially pre-dates most other available resources concerning the reigns of Šāpur I and his successors.

While Jesus is only rarely called Jesus the Splendour in other Manichaen writings, he is commonly called as such in the Kephalaia of the Teacher. In the Kephalaia, Jesus is an emanation of the Father of Greatness and apparently identical with the Third Envoy and the living word, brought forth to restore the damage done by the rebellion of the Archons. When Jesus the Splendour descends to the earth, he later takes on the shape of flesh to manifest himself in the material world.

References

Bibliography

External links
 Text

Manichaean texts